The 1963–64 OB I bajnokság season was the 27th season of the OB I bajnokság, the top level of ice hockey in Hungary. Eight teams participated in the league, and Ferencvarosi TC won the championship.

First round

Second round

Final round

Placing round

External links
 Season on hockeyarchives.info

Hun
OB I bajnoksag seasons
1963–64 in Hungarian ice hockey